Himayat Ali Shair (July 14, 1926 – July 15, 2019) was an Urdu poet, writer, film songwriter, actor and radio drama artist from Pakistan. He received the 2002 Pride of Performance Award for his literary services in Urdu literature from the president of Pakistan. He also received 2 Nigar Awards in 1962 and 1963 for 'Best Song Lyricist' for the Pakistani films "Aanchal" (1962) and "Daman" (1963).

Early life and education
Himayat Ali Shair was born in Aurangabad, Hyderabad Deccan, British India on 14 July 1926. His mother died when he was three years old. At a very young age, he was exposed to the leading leftist writers of that time. He did his master's degree in Urdu from the University of Sindh at Jamshoro, Pakistan.

Career
Himayat Ali Shair worked for All India Radio before migrating to Pakistan in 1951 to begin his career with Radio Pakistan in Karachi. His first poetry book "Aag Main Phool" was published in 1956 and received the Presidential Award in 1958. Later, he started his successful career as a film songs lyricist, receiving Nigar Awards for the films- Aanchal (1962 film) and Daaman (1963 film) respectively. In 1966, Shair produced and directed "Lori" (Lullaby song) starring Muhammad Ali, Zeba and Santosh Kumar.
 
Shair wrote the first few evergreen songs in the cinema of Pakistan. Some of the songs include Na Chura Sakogay Daaman, Jaag Utha Hai Sara Watan, Khudawanda Yeh Kaisi Aag, Jab Raat Dhali, Har Qadam Per Nit Naye Sanchay Main Dhal Jatay Hain Log, Tujh Ko Maloom Naheen, Tujh Ko Kya Maloom and many others.

His collection of poetry includes "Mitti Ka Qarz," "Tashnagi Ka Safar," "Haroon Ki Awaz," which received Allama Dr. Muhammad Iqbal Award and "Harf Harf Roshni." Shair is the only poet in Urdu literary history who wrote an autobiography titled "Aaina Sar Aaina." Over 400 pages, the autobiography is composed of as many as 3,500 couplets. In 2007, he published a collection of all of his poetry as "Kuliyat-e-Shair".

Himayat Ali Shair's research work for Pakistan Television titled Aqeedat ka safar (700 years of Na'at poetry) has also been published. Another series shed valuable light on 50 years of Naat poetry in Pakistan. His other TV programmes included Ghazal uss nay chheri (700 years of Urdu poetry), Khushboo ka safar (500 years of regional poets' Urdu poetry), Mohabbaton kay safeer (500 years of Sindhi poets' Urdu poetry) and Lub aazad (40 years of agitational poetry).

In 1976, he joined Sindh University as an associate Professor of Urdu Literature on the insistence of his friend and poet Shaikh Ayaz. He taught Urdu at this university from 1976 to 1987. He then retired from this job and chose to devote himself to literary pursuits. He quit the film industry as his children grew older, due to the fact that the film industry was not considered a respectable institute. In his words:
“Besides, my wife had been insisting that I switch to some 'decent' profession, even if it is a low-paid one, as she feared the grown-up children might follow in my footsteps and enter the film world. Her fears were not unfounded as one day I also observed my son Roshan Khayal, a university student then, sporting well-known actor Mohammad Ali's hairdo."

In 2002, Houston-based radio station Young Tarang released a CD based on Shair's poetry which included songs sung by famous Pakistani singers and recitations by Shair.

On 27 March 2010, a literary evening was organized in Hyderabad, Sindh by Kamaluddin Memorial Society in honor of Shair. The Vice-Chancellor of Sindh University, Dr. Nazir A. Mughal announced the establishment of "Himayat Ali Shair Chair" in recognition of his services to literature. He also announced five scholarships of Rs 5,000 each per month for research on literary contributions of Himayat Ali Shair for M.Phil/PhD degrees. A resolution was adopted on the occasion called for naming a road in the city after Himayat Ali Shair.

Personal life
Himayat Ali Shair married Meraj Naseem in 1949, they were together for 52 years when his wife died in Toronto, Ontario, Canada of liver cancer. She is buried in Pickering, Ontario, Canada where their children live.

Himayat Ali Shair spent most of his time in Pakistan and Canada where his children live and frequently visited his hometown in India, where his siblings reside.

Filmography
Himayat Ali Shair wrote film songs for the following Pakistani films:

Aanchal (1962)
Jab Se Dekha Hai Tumhein (1962)
Daaman (1963)
Dil Ne Tujhe Maan Liya
Ek Tera Sahara (1963)
Khamosh Raho (1964)
 Kaneez (1965 film)
 Naila (1965) (Himayat Ali Shair wrote only one song for this popular film, the rest were written by Qateel Shifai)
 Mujahid (1965)
Lori (1966) [wrote a highly popular lori (lullaby song) for this film]
Tasveer (1966)
Wali-Ehad (1968)

List of works/bibliography
An Kahi (a short story)
Aag Mein Phool (this collection of poetry won him a Presidential Award in 1959)
Shikast-e-Aarzoo
Mitti Ka Qarz (poetry)
Harf Harf Roshani (poetry)

Awards and recognition
Pride of Performance Award by the President of Pakistan in 2002
Nigar Award for film Aanchal (1962) and Daaman (1963) as 'Best Film Song Lyricist'Makhdoom Mohiuddin International Award in Delhi, India in 1989Life Achievement Award in Washington in 2001Allama Iqbal Award
Naqoosh Award

Death 
Himayat Ali Shair died in Toronto, Canada on 15 July 2019 at age 93. He reportedly suffered a heart attack. Among his survivors are his eight children, four boys and four girls.

References

External links

Pakistani poets
Urdu-language poets from Pakistan
Pakistani people of Hyderabadi descent
2019 deaths
1926 births
Nigar Award winners
Pakistani songwriters
Recipients of the Pride of Performance
People from Aurangabad, Maharashtra
Muhajir people
Pakistani emigrants to Canada